Maguindanao may refer to:
 Maguindanao, a former province of the Philippines
 Maguindanao people, in the Philippines
 Maguindanao language, their Austronesian language
 Sultanate of Maguindanao, a former sultanate in the province
 Maguindanao massacre

See also
Mindanao (disambiguation)